This electoral calendar 2005 lists the national/federal direct elections held in 2005 in the de jure and de facto sovereign states and their dependent territories. Referendums are included, although they are not elections. By-elections are not included.

January
 2 January: Croatia, President (1st round)
 9 January: Palestin, National Authority, President
 12 January: Abkhazia, Rerun of the presidential election
 16 January: Croatia, President (2nd round)
 22 January: Maldives, Parliament
 25 January: Tokelau, Island council
 30 January: Iraq, Parliament

February
 6 February: Thailand, Parliament
 8 February: Denmark, Parliament
 20 February: Portugal, Parliament
 20 February: Northern Cyprus, Parliament
 20 February: Spain, referendum on the European Constitution
 21 February: Anguilla, Parliament
 27 February: Tajikistan, Parliament (1st round)
 27 February: Kyrgyzstan, Parliament (1st round)
 28 February: Burundi, referendum on the new constitution

March
 6 March: Moldova, Parliament
 8 March: Micronesia, Parliament
 11 and 13 March: Liechtenstein, Parliament
 13 March: Central African Republic, President (1st round)
 13 March: Kyrgyzstan, Parliament (2nd round)
 17 March: Tonga, Parliament
 24 March: Tajikistan, Parliament (2nd round)
 31 March: Zimbabwe, Parliament

April
 8 April: Djibouti, President
 17 April: Northern Cyprus, President
 24 April: Andorra, Parliament
 24 April: Togo, President
 30 April: Niue, Parliament

May
 5 May–23 June: United Kingdom, Parliament
 5 May: Dominica, Parliament
 8 May: Central African Republic, President (2nd round)
 11 May: Cayman Islands, Parliament
 14 May: Republic of China, National Assembly
 15 May: Ethiopia, Parliament
 22 May: Mongolia, President
 25 May: Egypt, Constitutional referendum
 25 May: Suriname, Parliament
 29 May: France, referendum on the European Constitution
 29 May: Lebanon, Parliament

June
 1 June: Netherlands, referendum on the European Constitution
 5 June: Switzerland, referendum on Schengen and Dublin treaties, as well as on civil unions for homosexuals
 6 June: Chad, referendum on presidential terms
 17 June: Iran, President
 19 June: Guinea-Bissau, President
 5/12/19 June: Lebanon, Parliament
 19 June: Nagorno-Karabakh Republic, Parliament
 24 June: Iran, President (2nd round)
 25 June: Bulgaria, Parliament

July
 3 July: Albania, Parliament
 3 July: Mauritius, Parliament
 4 July: Burundi, Parliament
 10 July: Kyrgyzstan, President
 10 July: Luxembourg, referendum on the European Constitution

August
 19 August: Burundi, President
 27 August: Singapore, President
 30 August: Saint Helena, Parliament

September
 7 September: Egypt, President
 11 September: Japan, House of Representatives
 12 September: Norway, Parliament
 17 September: New Zealand, Parliament
 18 September: Afghanistan, Parliament
 18 September: Germany, Federal Parliament
 23 September: Aruba, Parliament
 25 September: Poland, Sejm and Senate
 25 September: Macau, Parliament
 29 September: Somaliland, Parliament

October
 9 October: Poland, President (1st round)
 11 October: Liberia, President, Senate, and House of Representatives
 15 October: Iraq, constitutional referendum
 19 October: Jersey, Senators
 23 October: Argentina, Congress and senate
 23 October: Poland, President (2nd round)
 23 October: Brazil, referendum on the prohibition of personal firearms

November
 6 November: Azerbaijan, Parliament
 8 November: Northern Mariana Islands, Governor, House and Senate
 13 November: Burkina Faso, President
 15 November: Greenland, Parliament
 17 November: Falkland Islands, Legislative Council
 17 November: Sri Lanka, President
 19/20 November: Egypt, Parliament
 1 December: Egypt, Parliament

 21 November: Kenya, Referendum on the new Constitution
 23 November: Jersey, Deputies
 26 November: Zimbabwe, Senate
 27 November: Armenia, Referendum on Constitution
 27 November: Honduras, President and Congress
 27 November: Gabon, President

December
 4 December: Venezuela, Parliament
 4 December: Kazakhstan, President
 7 December: St. Vincent and the Grenadines, Parliament
 11 December: Chile, President (1st Round), Parliament
 11 December: Transnistria, Parliament
 14 December: Tanzania, President and Parliament
 15 December: Iraq, Parliament
 18 December: Bolivia, President, Parliament
 18 December: Democratic Republic of Congo, Referendum on the new Constitution
 24 December: Pitcairn, Island council and island magistrate

See also
 Elections in 2005

References
 IFES Election Guide

 
Political timelines of the 2000s by year